Netfa Perry (born Netfa Ifeyinwa Perry) is an American actress. She is perhaps best known for her starring role as Sara on The WB hit comedy television series The Steve Harvey Show.  She has also guest starred in a number of notable television shows.

External links
Netfa Perry Twitter

Living people
African-American actresses
American film actresses
American television actresses
Actresses from New York City
Year of birth missing (living people)
21st-century African-American people
21st-century African-American women